Diamonds is a 1975 Israeli-American heist film. Robert Shaw stars in a dual role as twin brothers. Richard Roundtree, Barbara Hershey and Shelley Winters are co-stars. The film was also released as Diamond Shaft, although it has no relation to the Shaft films other than having Roundtree in the cast.

Plot
Charles Hodgson is a British aristocrat who decides to become a thief as a way of getting at his twin brother, Earl, a security expert who has built a supposedly impregnable vault in Tel Aviv, which holds a cache of diamonds. For the caper, Charles enlists Archie, a heist expert, and Sally. He also becomes acquainted with an American woman, Zelda Shapiro, who is in Israel looking for a new husband.

Cast
 Robert Shaw as Charles Hodgson / Earl Hodgson
 Richard Roundtree as Archie
 Barbara Hershey as Sally (credited as Barbara Seagull)
 Shelley Winters as Zelda Shapiro
 Shaike Ophir as Moshe
 Yosef Shiloach as Mustafa
 Gadi Yagil as Gaby
 Yehuda Efroni as Salzburg

See also
 List of American films of 1975

External links
 
 
 
 

1975 films
1975 crime drama films
1970s heist films
Israeli crime drama films
English-language Israeli films
Films directed by Menahem Golan
Films scored by Roy Budd
Embassy Pictures films
Films produced by Menahem Golan
Films set in Israel
Films about twin brothers
Films with screenplays by Menahem Golan
Films produced by Yoram Globus
1970s English-language films
American heist films
American crime drama films
1970s American films